The Women Film Critics Circle (WFCC) is a film critics and scholars association in the United States.  Found in 2004, WFCC was the first all-women group of this type in that country. 

WFCC has 75 members from the United  States and foreign countries who are involved in print, radio, television and online media.

Awards
The Circle has made annual awards, the Women Film Critics Circle Awards, since 2004. The categories are as follows (2019):

 Best Movie About Women
 Best Movie By A Woman
 Best Woman Storytelling [a storytelling award]
 Best Actress
 Best Actor
 Best Foreign Film By or About Women
 Best Documentary By or About Women
 Best Equality of the Sexes
 Best Animated Female
 Best Screen Couple
 Adrienne Shelly Award [For a film that most passionately opposes violence against women]
 Josephine Baker Award [For best expressing the woman of color experience in America]
 Karen Morley Award [For best exemplifying a woman’s place in history or society, and a courageous search for identity]
 Acting and Activism Award
 Lifetime Achievement Award
 The Pauline Kael Special Jury Awards
 Best Invisible Woman [supporting performance by a woman whose exceptional impact on the film dramatically, socially or historically, has been ignored]
 Best Female Action Heroes [May be collective, or social action rather than physical action]
 Worst Screen Mom of the Year Award
 The WFCC Hall of Shame

External links

2004 film awards
Women's film organizations
Awards established in 2004